Dasho Sonam Kinga is a Bhutanese politician and researcher at the Center for Bhutan Studies. He played the monk in the 2003 film Travellers and Magicians, for which he is also credited as a dialogue coach.

Sonam Kinga obtained his Ph.D and MA in Area Studies from Kyoto University, Japan, BA in English Honours from Sherubtse College, Bhutan and I.B (Diploma) from Lester B. Pearson College, Canada.

He started his career as a Publication Officer at the Curriculum Division of Ministry of Education in 1998. Later, he worked as Research Officer with the Centre for Bhutan Studies, Senior Program Officer with Save the Children US, Thimphu and Executive Editor for Bhutan Observer (private newspaper).

After his election to the National Council during the historic parliamentary elections of 2008, he served as the Deputy Chairperson between 2008-2013. He also served as Chairperson of the Good Governance Committee and House Committee.

An academic, his research and publications have focused on Bhutanese history, society, politics and culture. He is primarily interested in state-society relations in Bhutan, state rituals and oral literature. He is a Faculty Member at the Royal Institute of Governance and Strategic Studies.

Honours 
 :
  The Royal Red Scarf (17 December 2012).
  National Order of Merit [in Gold] (17 December 2014).

References

Bhutanese male actors
Kyoto University alumni
Members of the National Council (Bhutan)